K. K. S. S. R. Ramachandran (generally known as Sattur Ramachandran) is an Indian Tamil politician and current Minister for Revenue and Disaster Management, Government of Tamil Nadu. He had also been the minister for Backward Classes between 2006 and 2011 in the Tamil Nadu Legislative Assembly, India. He has been an MLA 9 times which record he holds with senior members like Duraimurugan and K. A. Sengottaiyan among currently serving MLAs, with a political career spanning over 40 years. His full name is Kopalapuram Kanthasamy Subbu Reddiyar Ranganathan Ramachandran.

Political career 
He has been elected to the Tamil Nadu Assembly eight times and won on three consecutive occasions as an All India Anna Dravida Munnetra Kazhagam (AIADMK) candidate from the Sattur constituency. After the death of M. G. Ramachandran, he won the neighbouring Vilathikulam constituency as a candidate for the AIADMK (Jayalalitha faction). He started Anna Puratchi Thalaivar Munnetra Kazhagam with Su. Thirunavukkarasar in 1989. He again won Sattur, as a candidate for the then-new Anna Puratchi Thalaivar Munnetra Kazhagam (but register as the candidate of Thayaga Marumalarchi Kazhagam) and subsequently suffered his first defeat after re-joining and merged his party with AIADMK in 1996. Switching allegiance once more - this time to the Dravida Munnetra Kazhagam - he won the next two elections, in 2001 and 2006.

He was the Minister for Cooperation and Public Works Department in the M. G. Ramachandran Cabinet between 1984 and 1987. In M. Karunanidhi Cabinet he was appointed the Minister for Health, and later appointed the Minister for Backward class welfare between 2006 and 2011. Currently, he is the Minister for Revenue and Disaster Management.

Elections contested and results

References 

https://www.thehindu.com/news/national/tamil-nadu/remembering-ancestors/article34126952.ece/amp/

All India Anna Dravida Munnetra Kazhagam politicians
Living people
Dravida Munnetra Kazhagam politicians
Tamil Nadu ministers
Year of birth missing (living people)
Tamil Nadu MLAs 1977–1980
Tamil Nadu MLAs 1980–1984
Tamil Nadu MLAs 1985–1989
Tamil Nadu MLAs 1989–1991
Tamil Nadu MLAs 1991–1996
Tamil Nadu MLAs 2001–2006
Tamil Nadu MLAs 2006–2011
Tamil Nadu MLAs 2016–2021
Tamil Nadu MLAs 2021–2026